Tom Hayes may refer to:

Business
 Tom Hayes (author) (born 1960), business writer, Silicon Valley businessman
 Tom Hayes (trader), former UBS trader, the first person to be convicted in relation to the Libor Scandal

Politics
 Tom Hayes (Australian politician) (1890–1967), member of the Victorian Legislative Assembly
 Tom Hayes (civil servant), former director of the Ohio Department of Job and Family Services
 Tom Hayes (Irish politician) (born 1952), Irish Fine Gael Party politician, TD and senator
 Tom Hayes (public servant), former Comptroller-General of the Australian Customs Service

Sports
 Tom Hayes (cornerback) (born 1946), former American football cornerback
 Tom Hayes (American football coach) (born 1949), retired college and professional American football coach
 Tom Hayes (Australian footballer) (1921–2010), played with North Melbourne in the Victorian Football League
 Tom Hayes (soccer) (born 1963), retired American soccer forward

See also
 Thomas Hayes (disambiguation)